Diego Pacheco (born March 8, 2001) is an American professional boxer.

Amateur career 
Pacheco began boxing at the age of ten and amassed over seventy-five bouts and eight National championships in his amateur career. At the time he turned professional, he was ranked as the top amateur middleweight in both the United States and Mexico.

Professional career 

In October 2018 Pacheco signed with Eddie Hearn's Matchroom Boxing USA. He made his professional debut on December 22, 2018, at the Auditorio Fausto Gutiérrez Moreno in Tijuana, Mexico, against Luis Carlos Gonzalez, winning by knockout (KO) early in the first round. In 2019, he fought and won seven times, including six victories by way of KO. On December 7, 2019, he featured on the undercard of Andy Ruiz Jr. vs Anthony Joshua II in Riyadh, Saudi Arabia, knocking out the more experienced opponent Selemani Saidi with a right hand.

On February 29, 2020, Pacheco defeated Oscar Riojas via six-round unanimous decision (UD) on the undercard of Mikey Garcia vs. Jessie Vargas at the Ford Center at The Star in Frisco, Texas.

On March 5, 2022 Pacheco stopped Genc Pllana in the second round. On June 10, 2022 he defeated Raul Ortega via fourth-round RTD.

Fighting Style 

At 6'4", Pacheco is well known for his length and superior sense of timing, as well as for having power in both hands.

Professional boxing record

References

External links

2001 births
Mexican male boxers
Living people
American male boxers
Boxers from Los Angeles
Super-middleweight boxers
American people of Mexican descent